In Māori mythology, the hākuturi are guardians of the forest. They are responsible for guarding the forest, and to avenge any desecration of its sacredness. When Rātā cut down a tree without first making the proper incantations and rituals, the hākuturi rebuked him by re-erecting the tree. When he showed remorse, they felled the tree again and made it into a canoe for him in a single night. The hākuturi seem to have been regarded as birds or birdlike: one source calls them the children of Tāne, god of the forest and ancestor of birds (Orbell 1998:23–24). A Ngati Kahungunu version (White 1887–1891, III:2) refers to 'the host of Haku-tiri, of Roro-tini, and of Pona-ua'. This last word would seem to imply some relationship to the Ponaturi (Tregear 1891:43).

References
M. Orbell, The Concise Encyclopedia of  Māori Myth and Legend (Canterbury University Press: Christchurch), 1998.
E. R. Tregear, Maori-Polynesian Comparative Dictionary (Lyon and Blair: Lambton Quay), 1891.
J. White, The Ancient History of the Maori, 7 Volumes (Government Printer: Wellington), 1887–1891.

Māori legendary creatures
Forest spirits